Grotów may refer to the following places:
Grotów, Strzelce-Drezdenko County in Lubusz Voivodeship (west Poland)
Grotów, Żary County in Lubusz Voivodeship (west Poland)
Grotów, Masovian Voivodeship (east-central Poland)